Vlorë is a city in southwestern Albania on the Adriatic Sea within the Mediterranean Sea.

Vlorë may also refer to:

 Vlorë County, an administrative county surrounding Vlorë
 Vlorë District, a former administrative district surrounding Vlorë
 Bay of Vlorë, a bay where Vlorë is geographically located
 Vlorë frank, former currency of Vlorë

See also 
 Principality of Valona